{{Infobox military person
| name          =Otto Hartmann
| image         =
| caption       =
| birth_date          = 
| death_date          = 
| placeofburial_label = Steinback Cemetery, Grave 504
| placeofburial = Vladslo, Belgium
| birth_place  =Nassau, Kingdom of Württemberg, German Empire
| death_place  =over English Channel, off Diksmuide, Belgium
| placeofburial_coordinates = 
| nickname      =
| allegiance    =German Empire
| branch        =Aviation
| serviceyears  =1908 - 1917
| rank          =Hauptmann
| unit          =Flieger-Abteilung (Flier Detachment) 48;Kampfstaffel; (Tactical Bomber Squadron) 48;Schutzstaffel (Protection Squadron) 3;Jagdstaffel 18 (Fighter Squadron 18) 
| commands      =Jagdstaffel 28 (Fighter Squadron 28)
| battles       = World War I 
| awards        =Iron Cross (both classes) Kingdom of Württemberg's Medal of Military Merit
| relations     =
| laterwork     =
}}
Hauptmann Otto Hartmann (7 February 1889 – 3 September 1917) was a German World War I flying ace credited with seven aerial victories.Franks, Bailey, Guest 1993, p. 125.

Biography

Otto Hartmann was born on 7 February 1889, in Nassau, Kingdom of Württemberg, the German Empire. He entered the Imperial German Army as a cadet on 5 March 1908.

He was in service during early World War I, being twice wounded, on 12 August 1915 and 10 June 1916. During 1916, he became an aerial observer in Flieger-Abteilung (Flier Detachment) 48 of the Luftstreitkräfte. He was promoted to Hauptmann on 6 October 1916. Hartmann won his first aerial victories as an observer, on 22 October and 6 November 1916. He undertook pilot training and was posted to Schutzstaffel (Protection Squadron) 3. On 17 May 1917, he was transferred to Jagdstaffel (fighter squadron) 18. On 6 June 1917, he took command of Jagdstaffel 28 after its Staffelführer, Karl Emil Schafer, was killed in action. Hartmann would score five more aerial victories between 21 June and 21 August 1917.

At 0815 hours 3 September 1917, Otto Hartmann was killed by two bullets through the head while engaging a No.48 Squadron Bristol F.2 Fighter crewed by Lts. Robert Dodds and Thomas Tuffield. Hartmann and his plane fell into the English Channel north of Diksmuide, Belgium. Four days later, Hartmann's remains washed up on the Belgian coast. He was buried in grave 504, Steinbach Cemetery, Germany.

During his service to his country, Otto Hartmann was awarded both classes of the Iron Cross and the Kingdom of Württemberg's Medal of Military Merit.

External links
  links to a photograph of Otto Hartmann's gravestone

Sources of information

References
 Above the Lines: The Aces and Fighter Units of the German Air Service, Naval Air Service and Flanders Marine Corps, 1914–1918''. Norman Franks, Frank W. Bailey, Russell Guest. Grub Street, 1993. .

1889 births
1917 deaths
Aviators killed by being shot down
German military personnel killed in World War I
German World War I flying aces
Luftstreitkräfte personnel
Military personnel of Württemberg
People from the Kingdom of Württemberg
People from Weikersheim
Recipients of the Iron Cross (1914), 1st class
Military personnel from Baden-Württemberg